Ricarda Lisk (born 1 February 1981 in Schorndorf, Baden-Württemberg), is a German professional triathlete, National Elite Champion of the year 2010, and a permanent member of the German Kader, i.e. the National Team.

National Junior Champion of the year 1999 and National U23 Champion of the year 2004, Lisk placed 15th at the Olympic Games in Beijing (2008), just a few seconds behind the 2004 gold medalist Kate Allen, thus proving to be the best female triathlete in the German team.

Biography 
In Germany, Ricarda Lisk has represented the club VfL Waiblingen since 1992.
She is part of the Olympic Project 2012 at the high performance centre in Saarbrücken.
Up to 2005, Ricarda Lisk was also part of the military elite team (Bundeswehr-Sportfördergruppe) based in Saarbrücken and as a sergeant, Stabsunteroffizier, she won silver (women individual senior ranking) at two World Military Triathlon Championships (Belfort: 4–8 June 2004, Ventura: 22–26 June 2005).

Ricarda Lisk holds a degree in sports management (2004). At present she studies business administration at the Fernuniversität Hagen.

Lisk lives in Waiblingen, Saarbrücken, Pontevedra and, in winter, in Stellenbosch.
The Spanish triathlete Javier Gomez and Ricarda Lisk are a couple and, representing the Galician club Cidade de Lugo Fluvial, both attend triathlons in Spain as well. E.g. they won the Triatlón de Aguilas on 30 May 2010.

French Club Championship Series 
Since 2006 Ricarda Lisk has represented Tri Club Châteauroux 36 in the prestigious French Club Championship Series Grand Prix de Triathlon. This club relies exclusively on its foreign guest stars.
In 2010, Lisk placed 14th, 5th and 6th at Dunkirk (23 May 2010), Beauvais (13 June 2010) and Tourangeaux (29 August 2010). Thus she was always among the three .

ITU Competitions 
In the twelve years from 1999 to 2010, Ricarda Lisk took part in 67 ITU competitions and achieved 24 top ten positions, among which four gold medals.
The following list is based upon the official ITU rankings and the Athlete's Profile Page.

BG = the sponsor British Gas · DNF = did not finish · DNS = did not start

Gallery

External links 
 Ricarda Lisk's Homepage in German

Notes 

1981 births
Living people
People from Schorndorf
Sportspeople from Stuttgart (region)
German female triathletes
Olympic triathletes of Germany
Triathletes at the 2008 Summer Olympics